The Syrian Revolution, was the early stage of protests – with subsequent violent reaction by the Syrian Arab Republic – lasting from March to 28 July 2011, as part of the wider Arab Spring in the Arab world. The uprising, which demanded democratic reforms, evolved from initially minor protests, beginning as early as January 2011 and transformed into massive protests in March. The uprising was marked by massive anti-government opposition demonstrations against the Ba'athism of Bashar al-Assad, meeting with police and military violence, massive arrests and a brutal crackdown, resulting in thousands of deaths and tens of thousands wounded.

Despite Bashar al-Assad's attempts to crush the protests with the massive crackdown, use of censorship on one hand and concessions on the other, by the end of April it became clear the situation was getting out of his control and his government deployed numerous troops on the ground. The regime's deployment of large-scale violence against protestors and civilians led to the emergence of numerous opposition militias and massive defections from the Syrian Army, which gradually transformed the conflict from a civil uprising to an armed rebellion, and later a full-scale civil war. The Free Syrian Army was formed on 29 July 2011, marking the transition into armed insurgency.

Massive protests and a violent crackdown led to international condemnation and support for the protesters. As the war progressed in October–November 2011, protests against the government and the war strengthened with thousands deaths and hundreds of thousands of casualties. The protests were marred by a massive crackdown which angered more protesters in northern and western Syria. The regime also deployed sectarian Shabiha death squads to attack the protestors. Protests and riots continued by students and the youth despite aggressive suppression.

Background

At the onset of the Arab Spring, Ba'athist Syria was considered as the most restrictive police state in the Arab World; with a tight system of regulations on the movement of civilians, independent journalists and other unauthorized individuals. Reporters Without Borders listed Syria as the 6th worst country in its 2010 Press Freedom Index. Before the uprising in Syria began in mid-March 2011, protests were relatively modest, considering the wave of unrest that was spreading across the Arab world. Until March 2011, for decades Syria had remained superficially tranquil, largely due to fear among the people of the secret police arresting critical citizens.

Factors contributing to social unrest in Syria include socio-economic stress caused by the Iraqi conflict (2003–present), as well as the most intense drought ever recorded in the region. For decades, the Syrian economy, army and government had been dominated patronage networks of Ba'ath party elites and Alawite clients loyal to Assad family. Assad dynasty held a firm grip over most sectors of the Syrian economy and corruption was endemic in the public and private sectors. The pervasive nature of corruption had been a source of controversy within the Ba'ath party circles as well as the wider public; as early as the 1980s. The persistence of corruption, sectarian bias, nepotism and widespread bribery that existed in party, bureaucracy and military led to popular anger that resulted in the large-scale protests of the Revolution.

Minor protests calling for government reforms began in January, and continued into March. At this time, massive protests were occurring in Cairo against Egyptian President Hosni Mubarak, and in Syria on 3 February via the websites Facebook and Twitter, a "Day of Rage" was called for by activists against the government of Bashar al-Assad, to be held on Friday, 4 February. This did not result in protests.

Civil uprising (March–July 2011)

March 2011 unrest

In the southern city of Daraa, sometimes called the "Cradle of the Revolution", protests had been triggered on 6 March by the incarceration and torture of 15 young students from prominent families who were arrested for writing anti-government graffiti in the city, reading: "" – ("The people want the fall of the regime") – a trademark slogan of the Arab Spring. The government claimed that the boys weren't attacked, and that Qatar incited the majority of the protests. Writer and analyst Louai al-Hussein, referencing the Arab Spring ongoing at that time, wrote that "Syria is now on the map of countries in the region with an uprising". Demonstrators clashed with local police, and confrontations escalated on 18 March after Friday prayers. Security forces attacked protesters gathered at the Omari Mosque using water cannons and tear gas, followed by live fire, killing four.

On 20 March, a crowd burned down the Ba'ath Party headquarters and other public buildings. Security forces quickly responded, firing live ammunition at crowds, and attacking the focal points of the demonstrations. The two-day assault resulted in the deaths of seven police officers and fifteen protesters.

Meanwhile, minor protests occurred elsewhere in the country. Protesters demanded the release of political prisoners, the abolition of Syria's 48-year emergency law, more freedoms, and an end to pervasive government corruption. The events led to a "Friday of Dignity" on 18 March, when large-scale protests broke out in several cities, including Banias, Damascus, al-Hasakah, Daraa, Deir az-Zor, and Hama. Police responded to the protests with tear gas, water cannons, and beatings. At least 6 people were killed and many others injured.

On 25 March, mass protests spread nationwide, as demonstrators emerged after Friday prayers. At least 20 protesters were reportedly killed by security forces. Protests subsequently spread to other Syrian cities, including Homs, Hama, Baniyas, Jasim, Aleppo, Damascus and Latakia. Over 70 protesters in total were reported killed.

Crackdown

Even before the uprising began, the Syrian government had made numerous arrests of political dissidents and human rights campaigners, many of whom were understood as terrorists by the Assad government. In early February 2011, authorities arrested several activists, including political leaders Ghassan al-Najar, Abbas Abbas, and Adnan Mustafa.

Police and security forces responded to the protests violently, using water cannons and tear gas as well as physically beating protesters and firing live ammunition. The regime also deployed the dreaded Shabiha death squads, consisting of fervent Alawite loyalists, that were ordered to execute sectarian attacks on the protestors, torture Sunni demonstrators and engage in anti-Sunni rhetoric. This policy led to large-scale desertions within the army ranks and further defections of officers who began forming a resistance movement.

As the uprisings intensified, the Syrian government waged a campaign of arrests that captured tens of thousands of people. In response to the uprising, Syrian law had been changed to allow the police and any of the nation's 18 security forces to detain a suspect for eight days without a warrant. Arrests focused on two groups: political activists, and men and boys from the towns that the Syrian Army would start to besiege in April. Many of those detained experienced ill-treatment. Many detainees were cramped in tight rooms and were given limited resources, and some were beaten, electrically jolted, or debilitated. At least 27 torture centers run by Syrian intelligence agencies were revealed by Human Rights Watch on 3 July 2012.

President Assad characterized the opposition as armed terrorist groups with Islamist "takfiri" extremist motives, portraying himself as the last guarantee for a secular form of government. Early in the month of April, a large deployment of security forces prevented tent encampments in Latakia. Blockades were set up in several cities to prevent the movement of protests. Despite the crackdown, widespread protests continued throughout the month in Daraa, Baniyas, Al-Qamishli, Homs, Douma and Harasta.

Concessions

 

During March and April, the Syrian government, hoping to alleviate the unrest, offered political reforms and policy changes. Authorities shortened mandatory army conscription, and in an apparent attempt to reduce corruption, fired the governor of Daraa. The government announced it would release political prisoners, cut taxes, raise the salaries of public sector workers, provide more press freedoms, and increase job opportunities. Many of these announced reforms were never implemented.

The government, dominated by the Alawite sect, made some concessions to the majority Sunni and some minority populations. Authorities reversed a ban that restricted teachers from wearing the niqab, and closed the country's only casino. The government also granted citizenship to thousands of Syrian Kurds previously labeled "foreigners". Following Bahrain's example, the Syrian government held a two-day national dialogue in July, in attempt to alleviate the crisis. The dialogue was a chance to discuss the democratic reforms and other issues, however many of the opposition leaders and protest leaders refused to attend citing the continuing crackdown on protesters in streets.

A popular demand from protesters was an end of the nation's state of emergency, which had been in effect for nearly 50 years. The emergency law had been used to justify arbitrary arrests and detention, and to ban political opposition. After weeks of debate, Assad signed the decree on 21 April, lifting Syria's state of emergency. However, anti-government protests continued into April, with activists unsatisfied with what they considered vague promises of reform from Assad.

Further reforms

During the course of the civil war, there have been some political changes towards the electoral process and the constitution.

Military operations

April 2011

As the unrest continued, the Syrian government began launching major military operations to suppress resistance, signaling a new phase in the uprising. On 25 April, Daraa, which had become a focal point of the uprising, was one of the first cities to be besieged by the Syrian Army. An estimated hundreds to 6,000 soldiers were deployed, firing live ammunition at demonstrators and searching house to house for protesters, slaughtering hundreds. Tanks were used for the first time against demonstrators, and snipers took positions on the rooftops of mosques. Mosques used as headquarters for demonstrators and organizers were especially targeted. Security forces began shutting off water, power and phone lines, and confiscating flour and food. Clashes between the army and opposition forces, which included armed protesters and defected soldiers, led to the death of hundreds. By 5 May, most of the protests had been suppressed, and the military began pulling out of Daraa, with some troops remaining to keep the situation under control.

May 2011
During the crackdown in Daraa, the Syrian Army also besieged and blockaded several towns around Damascus. Throughout May, situations similar to those that occurred in Daraa were reported in other besieged towns and cities, such as Baniyas, Homs, Talkalakh, Latakia, and several other towns. After the end of each siege, violent suppression of sporadic protests continued throughout the following months. By 24 May, the names of 1,062 people killed in the uprising since mid-March had been documented by the National Organization for Human Rights in Syria.

June–July 2011

As the uprising progressed, opposition fighters became better equipped and more organized. Until September 2011, about two senior military or security officers defected to the opposition. Some analysts stated that these defections were signs of Assad's weakening inner circle.

The first instance of armed insurrection occurred on 4 June 2011 in Jisr ash-Shugur, a city near the Turkish border in Idlib province. Angry protesters set fire to a building where security forces had fired on during a funeral demonstration. Eight security officers died in the fire as demonstrators took control of a police station, seizing weapons. Clashes between protesters and security forces continued in the following days. Some security officers defected after secret police and intelligence agents executed soldiers who refused to kill the civilians. On 6 June, Sunni militiamen and army defectors ambushed a group of security forces heading to the city which was met by a large government counterattack. Fearing a massacre, insurgents and defectors, along with 10,000 residents, fled across the Turkish border.

In June and July 2011, protests continued as government forces expanded operations, repeatedly firing at protesters, employing tanks against demonstrations, and conducting arrests. The towns of Rastan and Talbiseh, and Maarat al-Numaan were besieged in early June. On 30 June, large protests erupted against the Assad government in Aleppo, Syria's largest city. On 3 July, Syrian tanks were deployed to Hama, two days after the city witnessed the largest demonstration against Bashar al-Assad.

During the first six months of the uprising, the inhabitants of Syria's two largest cities, Damascus and Aleppo, remained largely uninvolved in the anti-government protests. The two cities' central squares have seen organized rallies of hundreds of thousands in support of president Assad and his government.

October 2011 – June 2012
Mass protests and riots continued throughout October and it was met with violent repression. In October 2011, 4 days of anti-government demonstrations led to beatings and fighting nationwide. Students, workers, employees, retirees, peasants, farmers, university students and street vendors participated in the movement daily. These protests started as 200 participants but it culminated as killings and beating was reported into tens of thousands. As rioting and looting was held, protesters were killed by security forces and in clashes between police and rioters, live ammunition and plastic bullets were fired. During the demonstrations on 18–19 November, 4–18 protesters were killed as they tried to March into Damascus and the residence of Bashar al-Assad, president of Syria. Workers demanded their wages to be paid. Stones and rocks were thrown at pictures of Bashar al-Assad on billboards. During protests in Aleppo in May 2012, police fired tear gas and used gunfire, striking retirees. During demonstrations by farmers and workers in Raqqah in January–April, 21 people were killed in battles. Street protests in the hundreds continued until a raid on universities in September 2012.

Aftermath

On 29 July, a group of defected officers announced the formation of the Free Syrian Army (FSA). Composed of defected Syrian Armed Forces personnel, the rebel army seeks to remove Bashar al-Assad and his government from power. On 23 August, the Syrian National Council was formed as a political counterpart to the FSA.

Media coverage 

Reporting on this conflict was difficult and dangerous from the start: journalists were being attacked, detained, reportedly tortured and killed.
Technical facilities (internet, telephone etc.) were being sabotaged by the Syrian government. Both sides in this conflict tried to discredit their opponent by framing or referring to them with negative labels and terms, or by presenting false evidence.

See also

Timeline of the Syrian Civil War
Arab Spring
Timeline of the Arab Spring

References

Works cited 
 

2011 in Syria
2011 in the Syrian civil war
2011 protests
2011 riots
Syria
Protests in Syria
Riots and civil disorder in Syria
Syrian democracy movements
March 2011 events in Syria
April 2011 events in Syria
May 2011 events in Syria
June 2011 events in Syria
July 2011 events in Syria